Patrick or Pat Wright may refer to:

Patrick Wright, Baron Wright of Richmond (1931–2020), British diplomat
Patrick Wright (historian), British academic, writer and broadcaster
Pat Wright (baseball) (1868–1943), American baseball player
Pat Wright (footballer) (born 1940), English football coach and former player
Patrick Wright (rower) (born 1945), British rower
Patrisha Wright, American disabilities activist
 Patrinell "Pat" Wright, founder of the gospel group Total Experience Gospel Choir